Mohammad Kadir Nuristani (born 1925) was an Afghan field hockey player, who competed at the 1948 Summer Olympic Games. He played in all three matches.

References

External links
 

1925 births
Possibly living people
Afghan male field hockey players
Olympic field hockey players of Afghanistan
Field hockey players at the 1948 Summer Olympics
Place of birth missing